Sutirtha Bhattacharya was the Chairman & MD of Coal India Limited. Before taking charge of Coal India he was the CMD of state-owned Singareni Collieries Company.

Bhattacharya has advocated coal pollution mitigation technology to reduce harmful environmental impacts, while still seeking to double coal production.

He is a 1985 batch IAS officer and graduated from Presidency College, Kolkata, as a graduating student of the University of Calcutta.

He is presently the Chairperson of the West Bengal Electricity Regulatory Commission.

References

Living people
Indian chief executives
University of Calcutta alumni
Year of birth missing (living people)
Coal India